Chalatenango (known as "Chalate"  by locals) is a town and municipality in the Chalatenango department of El Salvador. It is the capital of the department. As of 1 May 2021, Alfredo Hernández of Nuevas Ideas (NI) is the municipality's mayor.

Overview
The coat of arms is the same as the department's, as is the flag.

It is divided administratively into 6 cantons and 36 caserios.

Sports
Chalatenango is home to the professional football teams Alacranes Del Norte and A.D. Chalatenango. The home ground for both clubs is Estadio José Gregorio Martínez. It features floodlights and a main stand with seating accommodation.

Another popular sport in the region is ranching or Jaripeo. Events take place every few months in the villages around Chalatenango and in the field opposite the Gregorio Martinez outside of Chalatenango city.

Notable residents 
 Samuel Castillo – footballer
 Gladys Landaverde – Olympic long-distance runner for El Salvador

References

External links
 
 

Municipalities of the Chalatenango Department